Electricity North West is a British electricity distribution network operator, responsible for the administration and maintenance of the network, that distributes electricity to the North West of England excluding Merseyside and parts of Cheshire.

Background and history
Electricity North West Limited is a private limited company registered in England and Wales. The company is ultimately owned by a consortium led by Kansai Electric Power Co. Inc; Equitix; and CNIC.

The principal activity of the group is the distribution of electricity in North West England on behalf of the electricity supply companies. Customers receive their electricity bill from their suppliers who pay for use of the electricity network. Electricity North West delivers electricity to five million people, in 2.4 million properties in the North West.

The distribution network had originated as NORWEB, the state-owned North West Electricity Board from 1948 to 1990.

On 19 December 2007, United Utilities Group plc sold United Utilities Electricity Limited to North West Electricity Networks (Jersey) Limited, a company advised by Colonial First State Global Asset Management and the Infrastructure Investment Group, which is advised by JP Morgan Asset Management.

United Utilities operated and maintained North West England's electricity network on behalf of Electricity North West Limited, until June 2010. On 30 June 2010, the company completed the purchase of United Utilities Electricity Services Limited (‘UUES’) from United Utilities Group PLC (‘UU’).

The purchase of UUES, which had previously been contracted to operate and maintain the network, established one group which owns, operates, manages and maintains its network. UUES was subsequently renamed Electricity North West Services Limited (‘ENWSL’). In November 2019, Equitix and power firm from Japan, Kansai Electric Power, acquired a 50% stake in ENW.

Operations
As the distribution network operator for much of North West England, Electricity North West owns and is responsible for the construction and maintenance of the network that distributes electricity in the region. This includes the inspection and maintenance of assets which include 13,000 km of overhead lines, 43,000 km of underground cables, and 38,000 transformers.

References

Electric power distribution network operators in the United Kingdom
British companies established in 2007
Companies based in Warrington